Gelson's is a regional supermarket chain operating in Southern California. It operates service-oriented stores mostly in upscale neighborhoods.

The Mayfair Connection actually began years before Gelson's did. Estimates put the genesis of the chain sometime around the stock market crash of 1929. In 1948, Arden Farms Company owned both Mayfair Markets and 48 California Van Markets. Arden created a new chain of stores: a new "Mayfair Markets", from the two existing chains. In the mid-1960s, the chain had extended to neighboring states: Arizona, Utah, Oregon, Washington, and Nevada, with more than 250 stores in total. Arden-Mayfair gradually sold off most of the stores, as the market favored supermarket formats that were larger in size. Over time, all the more upscale Mayfair stores were renovated and became branches of Gelson's.

History
The first Gelson's supermarket was opened in July 1951 by Bernard and Eugene Gelson. The second store opened in 1960 in Encino and the third store opened in 1965 in North Hollywood.

In 1966, Arden Group acquired Gelson's.

In February 2014, Arden Group sold Gelson's to TPG Capital for $394 million.

In 2015, the company acquired 8 stores from Haggen for $36 million.

In November 2017, Bob Mariano joined the board of directors of the company.

References

External links
 

1951 establishments in California
Encino, Los Angeles
Supermarkets of the United States